Hickam's dictum is a counterargument to the use of Occam's razor in the medical profession. While Occam's razor suggests that the simplest explanation is the most likely, implying in medicine that diagnosticians should assume a single cause for multiple symptoms, one form of Hickam's dictum states: "A man can have as many diseases as he damn well pleases." The principle is attributed to an apocryphal physician named Hickam, possibly John Barber Hickam, MD. When he began saying this is uncertain. In 1946 he was a housestaff member in medicine at Grady Memorial Hospital in Atlanta. Hickam was a faculty member at Duke University in the 1950s, and was later chairman of medicine at Indiana University from 1958 to 1970.

See also
Zebra (medicine)

References

External links

Medical terminology
Philosophy of medicine